(literally, Hawaii-Midway Battle of the Sea and Sky: Storm in the Pacific Ocean) is a 1960 Eastmancolor Japanese war film directed by Shūe Matsubayashi.

Storm Over the Pacific was the first color widescreen war film from Toho Studios. The film was made by many of the same individuals behind the Godzilla franchise, such as producer Tomoyuki Tanaka, special effects director Eiji Tsuburaya, and assistant special effects director Teruyoshi Nakano. Storm Over the Pacific was released in 1961 in the United States in a dubbed and abridged 98 minute version produced by Hugo Grimaldi as I Bombed Pearl Harbor.

Some special effects scenes were later incorporated as stock footage in the 1976 film Midway (which also stars Toshirō Mifune).

Plot
On 1 December 1941, a Japanese fleet of 30 warships sails for Hawaii. When diplomatic negotiations in Washington fail, the task force commander, Adm. Tamon Yamaguchi (Toshiro Mifune) receives orders to attack Pearl Harbor. On December 7, the surprise attack is carried out successfully.

Following the attack on Pearl Harbor, Koji returns to Japan and his childhood sweetheart, Keiko (Misa Uehara). Although deeply in love with Keiko, Koji fears that marriage will make him less worthy as a naval officer.

His faith in his leaders and his country remains strong through the successful campaigns of the early war, but is severely shaken by the disastrous events during the Battle of Midway, learning that reports back to the homeland are lies. In the battle, his carrier Hiryu is attacked by U.S. dive bombers and badly damaged. High-ranking officers order the ship abandoned, but rather than leave it as a prize of war, a Japanese destroyer is given instructions to sink the carrier. As the Hiryu goes down, Koji and others give a final salute.

Cast

Production
Film historian Stephen Pendo in Aviation in the Cinema (1985) noted Storm Over the Pacific heavily utilized models to create realistic battle scenes. The special effects were supervised by Eiji Tsuburaya who was renown for his work in numerous 1950s and 1960s Japanese horror and science fiction films. During his 50-year career as a special effects director, Tsuburaya worked on approximately 250 films in total.

In World War II, Tsuburaya had created the realistic attack scenes in Hawai Mare oki kaisen (The War at Sea from Hawaii to Malaya) (1942) that depicted the Pearl Harbor attacks. The same model scene was reprised for Storm Over the Pacific. Tsuburaya and his special effects team created 136 ship models for Storm Over the Pacific, including Japanese aircraft carrier Akagi and USS Yorktown aircraft carriers, 11 and 13 metres respectively. The 1/16th scale models of ships were shot in a large water tank.

The miniature photography in Storm Over the Pacific was subsequently re-used in a number of later films, including Midway (1976) and the Japanese films Admiral Yamamoto (1968) and The Imperial Navy (1981).

Reception
When Storm Over the Pacific was released, it met with critical approvals and was widely recognized as "telling the other side" or giving the Japanese perspective of World War II in the Pacific. Film historians Jack Hardwick and Ed Schnepf, however, dismissed the English version, I Bombed Pearl Harbor (1961) as poorly dubbed and with the predominance of "miniatures", as a pallid rival to Tora! Tora! Tora! (1970).

References

Notes

Bibliography

 Anderson, Joseph L. The Japanese Film: Art and Industry. Princeton, New Jersey: Princeton University Press, 1982. . 
 Hardwick, Jack and Ed Schnepf. "A Viewer's Guide to Aviation Movies". The Making of the Great Aviation Films, General Aviation Series, Volume 2, 1989.
 Pendo, Stephen. Aviation in the Cinema. Lanham, Maryland: Scarecrow Press, 1985. .
 Ragone, August. Eiji Tsuburaya: Master of Monsters. San Francisco, California: Chronicle Books, 2014, first edition 2007. .
 Tam, King-fai, Timothy Y. Tsu and Sandra Wilson, eds. Chinese and Japanese Films on the Second World War. London: routledge, 2014. .

External links
 
 

1960 films
Japanese aviation films
Japanese war films
Japanese epic films
1960s Japanese-language films
Seafaring films based on actual events
Toho films
War epic films
Pacific War films
World War II films based on actual events
Films about the United States Navy in World War II
Films directed by Shūe Matsubayashi
Japanese World War II films
Films set on aircraft carriers
Films about the Battle of Midway
1960s Japanese films
World War II aviation films
World War II naval films
Films about naval aviation
Films set in 1941
Films set in 1942